Arhopala elizabethae is a butterfly in the family Lycaenidae. It was described by John Nevill Eliot in 1959. It is found in the Indomalayan realm where it is endemic to Peninsular Malaya.

References

External links

Arhopala Boisduval, 1832 at Markku Savela's Lepidoptera and Some Other Life Forms. Retrieved June 3, 2017.

Arhopala
Butterflies described in 1959